Shahid Dastgheib 1 Secondary School (Persian: مدرسه ی متوسطه ی دوم شهید دستغیب یک) is a distinguished high school for gifted students located in Shiraz, Iran. The school is a member of the academic NODET organization, known for its high level of academic difficulty. The school is known for its challenging mathematics and science courses, and has continuously graduated many academic award winners and successful students.

Student life
The school's Student Government is in charge of running a number of events such as The Robotics Tournament and Computer Programming Contest. There are various kinds of clubs at the school ranging from the bridge designing club to Olympiad preparation clubs. Shahid Dastgheib is the most prestigious School in Shiraz, and arguably the best in the Southern region of the country. This is almost entirely due to the high demand and favorability of enrollment in the school, which results in the average student being much more intelligent and achieving than other schools, as is true with most NODET schools. While the school boasted some of the best percentages of student admission into prestigious post-secondary programs, this number has decreased over time, even though the Student Capacity has increased significantly. The reason for this is the retirement of accomplished and experienced teachers and their replacement with teachers who possess subpar teaching ability. Another reason for this is the transition of the executive branch of the school from a comprehensive overview of the students to a handpicked and biased plan which allows the school to maintain an academically successful facade, even though a significant number of students fail to be admitted to public and prestigious post-secondary institutions. Nevertheless, due to the abundance of over-achieving students, the school still ranks as one of the best and most respected schools in the country.

External links
 Shahid Dastgheib Official Website 1
 Shahid Dastgheib Official Website 2
 

High schools in Iran
Schools in Shiraz